The 1967–68 season was Blackpool F.C.'s 60th season (57th consecutive) in the Football League. They competed in the 22-team Division Two, then the second tier of English football, finishing third on goal-average.

Blackpool made it past the third round of the FA Cup for the first time in nine seasons. They had entered the competition at the third-round stage for each of those seasons.

Alan Skirton was the club's top scorer, with eighteen goals (seventeen in the league and one in the FA Cup). He and Gerry Ingram shared the accolade in the league, with seventeen goals apiece.

Table

Notes

References

Blackpool F.C.
Blackpool F.C. seasons